The province of Málaga is located in Andalusia, Spain. It is bordered by the Mediterranean Sea to the south and by the provinces of Cádiz to the west, Seville to the northwest, Córdoba to the north, and Granada to the east.

Overview 
The population density surpasses both the Andalusia and Spanish averages, reaching 222.53 inhabitants/km2. Málaga contains 102 municipalities. Besides the capital, its main cities are Marbella, Mijas, Fuengirola, Vélez-Málaga, Torremolinos, Estepona, and Benalmádena, all in the coastal zone. The towns of Antequera and Ronda are located in the interior.

The prevailing climate is a warm Mediterranean with dry and warm, long summers with short, mild winters. The geographical relief varies greatly from zone to zone. In general, the coastal zone has a subtropical Mediterranean climate. To the north, a continental Mediterranean climate exists with cold, dry winters and warm summers.

Its main industry and claim to fame is its tourist resorts, particularly those on the beaches along the Costa del Sol. These beaches are visited by millions of European tourists; other attractions include the gorge of El Chorro near Álora, El Torcal de Antequera, the Moorish-Mudéjar district of Frigiliana, the Dolmen of Menga, and the Caves of Nerja.

Population development
The historical population is given in the following chart:

Regions 

 Málaga
 Costa del Sol
 Valle del Guadalhorce
 Axarquía
 Serranía de Ronda
 Antequera

Protected areas 
 Los Alcornocales Natural Park
 Sierra de las Nieves National Park
 Montes de Málaga Natural Park
 Sierras of Tejeda, Almijara and Alhama Natural Park

See also 
 List of municipalities in Málaga

References

External links 

 The Caminito del Rey tourist information in English
 Video about Malaga province
 Malaga Metropolitan Transport Consortium Website
 Malaga Tourism